Cascade Creek is a stream in the U.S. state of South Dakota.

History
Cascade Creek was received its name on account of rapids near its mouth.

See also
List of rivers of South Dakota

References

Rivers of Fall River County, South Dakota
Rivers of South Dakota